Sarki Nafata of Gobir (r. 1797–98), one of a series of rulers of the small Hausa state of Gobir, today in northern Nigeria is best remembered for his opposition to Fulani Islamic reformer Usman dan Fodio, who later led a popular uprising against the Gobir rulers, and established the Sokoto Caliphate.

External links
List of rulers of Gobir
Igba Rumun Vishigh. CHRISTIANITY AND ISLAM IN DIALOGUE: NORTHWEST NIGERIA, 1960-1990. University of Jos, Nigeria (1997).

History of Nigeria